Christina Baret (born 16 June 1992) is a Malaysian cricketer. She represented Malaysia women's national cricket team at the 2014 Asian Games.

Baret was also the part of the Malaysian women's cricket team which won the bronze medal at the 2017 Southeast Asian Games after beating Singapore in the bronze medal contest by 2 wickets. In the 3rd place playoff she topscored with an unbeaten 22 runs and played a key role in an easy run chase against Singapore to secure the bronze medal.

She made her Women's Twenty20 International (WT20I) debut for Malaysia on 3 June 2018, in the 2018 Women's Twenty20 Asia Cup.

References

External links 
 Profile at CricHQ
 Malaysia cricket

1992 births
Living people
Malaysian women cricketers
Malaysia women Twenty20 International cricketers
Cricketers at the 2014 Asian Games
Asian Games competitors for Malaysia
Southeast Asian Games medalists in cricket
Southeast Asian Games bronze medalists for Malaysia
Competitors at the 2017 Southeast Asian Games